Making It (or Makin' It) may refer to:
 Makin' It (TV series), short-lived television sitcom in 1979
 "Makin' It" (song), 1979 song by David Naughton, used as a theme for the television series of the same name
 Making It (film), 1971 film written by Peter Bart
 Making It (TV series), 2018 unscripted reality competition series, co-hosted by Amy Poehler and Nick Offerman
 Making It Australia (TV series), a 2021 Australian series based on the American version, co-hosted by Susie Youssef and Harley Breen

See also